Night in Paradise is a 1946 American comedy-drama film produced by Walter Wanger and directed by Arthur Lubin.

In 560 BC King Croesus of Lydia incurs the wrath of the sorceress Queen Attossa he had promised to marry, when he chooses the beautiful Delarai of Persia instead.  Attossa, in disembodied form, mocks Croesus nearly to the point of madness, so he seeks a solution from the fortune-teller Aesop, who is very young and handsome, but believes that people only receive wisdom with age, arrived from the Isle of Samos in disguise of an old man with a hunch, a limp, and a cane.  But Aesop also has eyes for Delarai.

This expensive, lavish Technicolor production of plaster Grecian temples and painted skies was Wanger's second attempt to film the novel, and ended up costing $1.6 million and losing Universal some $800,000.  One source describes it as a kitschy "Maria Montez vehicle without Maria Montez".  (The correct title is Night in Paradise, not "A Night in Paradise" as some sources have it.)

Plot
In 560 BC King Croesus of Lydia incurs the wrath of the sorceress Queen Attossa he had promised to marry, when he chooses the beautiful Delarai of Persia instead.  Attossa, in disembodied form, mocks Croesus nearly to the point of madness, so he seeks a solution from the fortune-teller Aesop, who is very young and handsome, but believes that people only receive wisdom with age, arrived from the Isle of Samos in disguise of an old man with a hunch, a limp, and a cane.  But Aesop also has eyes for Delarai.

One day, Delarai invites Aesop to interpret a charm. As he does, he goes as his young self but with a different name, Jason. Delarai doesn't know at first, but as she sees the same scar on Jason's hand as Aesop's hand, she knows, and reveals that a hunch and a limp may be faked, but a scar remains a scar, and they fall in love with each other, but Atossa and the people in the palace suspect something is going on with Aesop and Delarai.

Croesus wanted the Oracle to tell him the truth and sends Aesop to retrieve it. As Aesop is packing, Delarai talks him out of it but fails. Aesop goes anyway, and Delarai cries herself to sleep. Aesop does go fetch it from a priest, but the priest refuses, saying his life is valuable. Aesop claims that if a priest's words do not mean anything, then his life means less and strangles him. He takes the priest's clothes and hides his face in the hood.

Delarai comes to the temple, wanting to seek for Aesop, but before she could say anything, Aesop reveals his young face slightly, and Delarai breaks out a smile. As the security guards see her smile, they unmask Aesop, and Aesop and Delarai run hand in hand. They are forced to jump off a cliff. They jump in each other arms, and Attosa reveals her image at sea, saying that Aesop and Delarai actually survived because of their faith, their love, and a little help from Attosa.

They live in a small cottage with a lake and a garden. Delarai is mending and Aesop's hand around on her shoulder, 12 boys come out saying "daddy!" which reveals that they got married and have children. "Another fable to bed?" asks the eldest son. Aesop replies "not tonight, tonight is mommy's night." Delarai and Aesop smile and they have a family hug.

Cast 

 Merle Oberon as Delarai
 Turhan Bey as Aesop
 Thomas Gomez as King Croesus
 Gale Sondergaard as Attosa
 Ray Collins as Leonides
 Ernest Truex as Scribe
 George Dolenz as Frigid Ambassador
 John Litel as Archon
 Jerome Cowan as Scribe
 Douglass Dumbrille as High Priest
 Paul Cavanagh as Cleomenes
 Marvin Miller as Scribe
 Moroni Olsen as High Priest
 Richard Bailey as Lieutenant
 William 'Wee Willie' Davis as Salabaar 
 unbilled players include Julie London
 unbilled singer Juli Lynne Charlot Opening title song

Production
The film was based on a novel by George Hellmann called The Peacock's Feathre which was published in 1931. In 1934 Hellman announced he had dramatised his own novel. The same year Walter Wanger announced he would make a film based on the novel as the third movie for his newly formed Walter Wanger Productions, after The President Vanishes and Private Worlds. It was to star Ann Harding. However the film was not made.

The project was reactivated in 1944 with Universal agreeing to make it with Wagner. The stars were to be Turhan Bey and Louise Abritten with Arthur Lubin to direct. In December 1944 Hedda Hopper reported that the film would star Maria Montez and that Wagner wanted Claude Rains for a key role. However, by January 1945 Merle Oberon had the lead.

Reception

Critical
Diabolique magazine later wrote "This is painful to watch, one of Lubin's worst movies; those Maria Montez-Jon Hall films were full of movement and pace but Paradise is basically a lot of hanging around a palace, relying on its two leads to provide star power they simply didn’t have. In a year where 90 million Americans went to the movies once a week, the film managed to lose $800,000 and killed Bey's career as a leading man."

Box office
The film recorded a loss of $790,711.

References

External links 

 
 Turner Classic Movies page

1946 films
Films directed by Arthur Lubin
Universal Pictures films
Films produced by Walter Wanger
Films scored by Frank Skinner
Films set in the 6th century BC
Films set in ancient Greece
Films set in classical antiquity
Films based on classical mythology
1940s historical films
American historical films
1940s English-language films
1940s American films